United Arab Emirates, an Islamic and Arabic country in the Middle East, was established in 1971 by the enormous efforts of its leaders. Despite its relatively short existence, it has devolved its own unique traditions and costumes that are distinguished from the nearby countries.

One of UAE's oldest tradition is falconry and it dates to past times. It is not known exactly when falconry emerged but some historians believe that it dates back 2000 years. Falconry was originally practiced as a source for food, to hunt hares and houbara mostly. In addition to that, it was considered a way of life for leaders of the tribe and the rest of the tribe; it was undertaken during daylight hours and later on it was the topic of discussion at evening get-togethers. Furthermore, there was another companion that went hand in hand with falcons, which was the saluki hunting dog. These were mainly for hunting down gazelles.

It requires a deal of patience, skill and courage to tame, capture and train a falcon. To protect this traditional sport and also to make sure that falcons were treated properly, a number of laws were laid down. The idea of placing trackers under each falcon's skin with a unique identification numbers was established by the Emirates Bird Society. This will help a great deal in tracking down the patterns of falcon's migration and will open new possibilities of preserving this unique breed. A few years ago, an idea to issue passports to these birds was undertaken and was aimed at checking the illegal trade of falcons.

Today, falconry is an endangered branch of Dubai's rich cultural legacy. Rapid urbanization in the UAE over the last few years has adversely affected the natural habitat of the falcons. Moreover, new falconers do not respect the codes of practicing this sport and also indulge in over-hunting. This has posed a threat to these beautiful birds as well as to the cultural offshoot of the game itself.

In order to preserve this sport for posterity's sake, the UAE government is working in collaboration with UNESCO for imbuing falconry with the status of a cultural heritage across the globe and attracting more Dubai holiday makers for this reason. Unesco  has taken the task to revive and promote the Traditional Sports and Games by creating the Ad-hoc Advisory Committee(AAC) and elected its Chairman Mr. Khalil Ahmed Khan an expert of TSG, who is also the President of the International Association of Traditional Wrestling Sports (IATWS) and Shammi Rana as Rapporteur Ad Hoc Advisory Committee Traditional Sports & Games,UNESCO.

Traditional boat-racing in Dubai-Coastal Areas 

In the traditional boat racing, long-boat races, although the boats are not quite as long as in the past, create an impressive picture as their tightly-packed crews labor at their oars, propelling their svelte boats through calm inshore waters under the appreciative gaze of spectators.

Camel racing 

Thoroughbred Racing Camels are first put through their paces when they are about two years old. Initially the animals are trained to obey basic commands issued by the jockey. Then, a crucial two-kilometer gallop decides which have the ability for racing. To help build their stamina, the camels are made to run certain distances every day, which varies in proportion to their age. Recently jockeys were banned from racing and instead robots were used it their place according to human right laws.

There are two main breeds being raced, the Omani and Sudania which differ in color - the Omani being very light and the Sudania more of a tan color. Traditionally, a racing camel was fed on dates, honey, alfalfa, milk and seeds. They were never allowed to drink the day before a race and were prevented from feeding for the 12 hours prior to a race. With this type of saddle the jockey sits behind the camel's hump.

Camel-racing, a traditional sport, is extremely popular in the Emirates. 
It was originally staged in an informal setting, at weddings or special festivals, 
but now customized tracks have been built throughout the country where race 
meetings are held in the winter months from October to April, culminating in the 
annual camel race festival at Al Wathba which attracts entrants from all over the world.

Racing camel's top speed . In the Gold Cup that was recently run at NAD al-Shiba, the winning camel covered the 10 kilometers in 17 minutes and seven seconds (6.21 miles, averaging 21.76 mph). Because camels' humps store fat-not water- lean, streamlined racing camels have very small, almost vestigial, humps. Compared to an ordinary, run-of-the-desert camel, a racing camel looks like an enormous over-tall greyhound. The Camel-racing is quite popular in Arab region and particularly in KSA.

References

"TRADITIONAL SPORTS ." www.grapeshisha.com. 2006. 20 May 2009 <https://web.archive.org/web/20090224181155/http://www.grapeshisha.com/traditional-sports.html>.

UNESCO Traditional Sports and Games

3rd Collective Consultation on the Safeguarding and Promotion of Traditional Sports and Games,UNESCO

4th Collective Consultation on the Safeguarding and Promotion of Traditional Sports and Games,UNESCO

International Council of Traditional Sports and Games

Sport in the United Arab Emirates
United Arab Emirates
Sports